"Corazón Bipolar" (English: "Bipolar Heart") is the first single by Mexican singer Paty Cantú from her third studio album, Corazón Bipolar, released in 2012.

Commercial performance
The song entered the top ten of the Billboard charts in Mexico, becoming a hit and helping promote the album which eventually certified gold there.

Charts

References

External links
"Corazón Bipolar" music video at YouTube.com

2012 singles
Paty Cantú songs
Spanish-language songs
Songs written by Paty Cantú
2012 songs
EMI Records singles